Amphicyclotulus amethystinus is a species of tropical land snail with a gill and an operculum, a terrestrial gastropod mollusk in the family Neocyclotidae.

Shell description 
The shell is smooth, shining, not striate spirally, generally somewhat more depressed, deep chestnut or reddish brown. Whorls are a little flattened near the suture. The species may have subtle spiral striation, although there exists considerable variation; axial growth lines are clearly visible.

The operculum is horny, diaphanous, concave externally, cartilaginous within, the nucleus projecting internally; with from ten to fourteen very narrow whorls, their rather lamellar outer edges slightly free.

Amphicyclotulus amethystinus has spiral threads absent or only weakly present. There are found only two species in the genus Amphicyclotulus in Dominica. The other species is Amphicyclotulus dominicensis and it has spiral cords clearly present and raised.

Robert John Lechmere Guppy (1868) noted that this species is not found above 1000 m. Although he recognized two “forms”, he did not recognize two separate species. George French Angas (1884) subsequently recorded “Cyclophorus amethystinus” from altitudes above 1200 m. Paul Bartsch (1942)<ref>Bartsch P. (1942). "The cyclophorid mollusks of the West Indies, exclusive of Cuba": 43-141. In: Torre C. de la, Bartsch P. & Morrison J. P. E. (1942). The cyclophorid operculate land mollusks of America". Bulletin United States National Museum 181: 1-306, pls 1-42.</ref> restricted the name amesthystinus to Guppy’s var. β, the “smooth, shining, not striate spirally” form.

Distribution

This species is endemic to in Dominica.

The type locality is Laudat, Dominica. The holotype is in National Museum of Natural History under number 535856.

All known localities of Amphicyclotulus amethystinus include:
 Saint Andrew Parish, Dominica: west of Calibishie, Hampstead Estate
 Saint Andrew Parish, Dominica: Carib Territory
 Saint Andrew Parish, Dominica: Marigot, Captain Bruce
 Saint Andrew Parish, Dominica: 1 km northwest of Thibaud
 Saint David Parish, Dominica: Emerald Pool
 Saint David Parish, Dominica: 1.5 km north of Petit Savane
 0.5 km south of Rosalie River bridge
 Saint George Parish, Dominica: Bellevue Chopin
 Saint George Parish, Dominica: Freshwater Lake area
 Saint George Parish, Dominica: trail to Lake Boeri
 Saint Joseph Parish, Dominica: d’Leau Grommier
 Saint Joseph Parish, Dominica: road to Fond Cassé, Mary Martin Farm
 Saint Joseph Parish, Dominica: path Mero-Salisbury
 Saint Luke Parish, Dominica: Pointe Michel
 Saint Paul Parish, Dominica: Sylvania
 Saint Peter Parish, Dominica: Syndicate.

References
This article incorporates CC-BY-3.0 text from the reference  and public domain text from the reference.

| name = Amphicyclotulus amethystinus''

Neocyclotidae
Endemic fauna of Dominica
Gastropods described in 1868